Actinokentia huerlimannii is a species of flowering plant in the family Arecaceae. It is found only in New Caledonia.

References

Archontophoenicinae
Endemic flora of New Caledonia
Conservation dependent plants
Taxonomy articles created by Polbot